William Webb Venable (September 25, 1880 – August 2, 1948) was a U.S. Representative from Mississippi.

Born in Clinton, Mississippi, Venable moved with his parents to Memphis, Tennessee, returned to Clinton, Mississippi, in 1891.
He attended public and private schools.
He was graduated from Mississippi College at Clinton in 1898, from the University of Mississippi at Oxford in 1899, and from the law department of Cumberland University, Lebanon, Tennessee, in 1905.
He was admitted to the bar in 1905 and commenced practice in Meridian, Mississippi.
He served as prosecuting attorney of Lauderdale County from April to October 1910, when he was appointed district attorney.
He served in the latter capacity until January 1, 1915, when he resigned.
He served as judge of the tenth judicial district of Mississippi from 1915 until his resignation in December 1916.

Venable was elected as a Democrat to the Sixty-fourth Congress to fill the vacancy caused by the death of Samuel A. Witherspoon.
He was reelected to the Sixty-fifth and Sixty-sixth Congresses and served from January 4, 1916, to March 3, 1921.
He was an unsuccessful for renomination.
Practiced law Clarksdale, Mississippi.
He died in New Orleans, Louisiana, August 2, 1948.
He was interred in Magnolia Cemetery, Meridian, Mississippi.

References

1880 births
1948 deaths
Democratic Party members of the United States House of Representatives from Mississippi
Mississippi state court judges
20th-century American judges
20th-century American politicians